Events from the year 1579 in art.

Events
The painter Giovanni Battista Paggi is said to have mortally wounded a patron, and is forced to flee his home city of Genoa.
The Da Zhao Temple is built in inner Mongolia.  Its art treasures include a 10 ft silver Sakyamuni buddha statue.

Works

 Federico Barocci paints the Madonna del Popolo (Uffizi).
 El Greco completes The Disrobing of Christ. 
 Giambologna begins the Rape of the Sabine Women, a remarkable example of Mannerist sculpture.
 George Gower paints a self-portrait.

Births
November 7 - Juan de Peñalosa, Spanish painter of altarpieces, a priest and poet (died 1633)
November 11 - Frans Snyders, Flemish still-life master, apprenticed in 1593 to Pieter II Brueghel (died 1657)
date unknown
Trophime Bigot, French painter (died 1649)
Carlo Saraceni, Italian early-Baroque painter of landscapes, cabinet paintings, and altarpieces (died 1620)
probable - Ottavio Viviani, Italian painter of quadratura (died 1641)

Deaths
February 5 - Giovanni Battista Moroni, Italian portrait painter (born 1520/1524)
March 28 - Juan Fernández Navarrete, Spanish Mannerist painter (born 1526)
October 15 - Marcello Venusti, Italian Mannerist painter primarily in Rome (born 1512/1515)
October 24 - Albert V, Duke of Bavaria, art patron and collector (born 1528)
November 21 - Cipriano Piccolpasso, Italian painter of majolica (born 1524)
December 21 – Juan Vicente Macip (or Vicente Joanes Masip), Spanish painter of the Renaissance period (born 1500)
date unknown 
Giovanni Bernardo Lama, Italian painter (born 1508)
Andrew Mansioun, French woodcarver and engraver at the court of King James V of Scotland (date of birth unknown)
Filippo Negroli, Italian armourer (born c.1510)

 
Years of the 16th century in art